Albert Deuring (born 2 March 1962) is an Austrian sports shooter. He competed in two events at the 1988 Summer Olympics.

References

1962 births
Living people
Austrian male sport shooters
Olympic shooters of Austria
Shooters at the 1988 Summer Olympics
People from Bregenz
Sportspeople from Vorarlberg
20th-century Austrian people